Jushin Liger may refer to:

 Jushin Liger (anime), an animated television program that debuted in 1989
 Jushin Liger, a professional wrestler who debuted in 1984